Temesa magalhaesi is a fossil species of air-breathing land snail, a terrestrial pulmonate gastropod mollusk in the family Clausiliidae, the door snails. The species is found in the Paleocene deposits of the Itaboraí Basin, in Brazil. This is the oldest{how old?} record of the subfamily, although the species is only tentatively placed in the genus.

References

Clausiliidae
Paleocene gastropods
Gastropods described in 1953